Farah El Fassi is a Moroccan actress.

Filmography

Feature films 

 2008: Le temps des camarades
 2011: L'enfant cheikh
 2015: Petits bonheurs

External links

References 

Living people
Moroccan actresses
1988 births